Lennox Valencia Miller (8 October 1946 in Kingston, Jamaica – 8 November 2004 in Pasadena, California) was a champion runner and father of Inger Miller.

Representing Jamaica, Miller won the silver medal in the 100 meters in the 1968 Summer Olympics and the bronze in the 1972 Summer Olympics, also in the 100.

He and Inger are the first father-daughter to win Olympic track and field medals. He was her coach prior to her winning gold in the 1996 Summer Olympics. Both ran for the University of Southern California, where Miller earned a degree in psychology and graduated from the dental school. He had been a dentist in Pasadena for 30 years.

While at USC, Miller anchored the still standing World Record 4x110 yard relay at the NCAA Men's Outdoor Track and Field Championships, held at Brigham Young University in Provo, Utah.  The Imperial distance became defunct as the IAAF now only recognizes metric races (except the one Mile run), so the event is rarely run and not part of elite competition.  The record was also complicated because of Miller's Jamaican citizenship, the makeup of the team was not entirely from one country.  Miller took the baton from O. J. Simpson.  Also on the team was future NFL star Earl McCullouch.

References
 Obituary at IAAF.org 
 

1946 births
2004 deaths
Sportspeople from Kingston, Jamaica
Jamaican male sprinters
Athletes (track and field) at the 1966 British Empire and Commonwealth Games
Athletes (track and field) at the 1968 Summer Olympics
Athletes (track and field) at the 1972 Summer Olympics
Athletes (track and field) at the 1970 British Commonwealth Games
Athletes (track and field) at the 1971 Pan American Games
Athletes (track and field) at the 1974 British Commonwealth Games
Olympic athletes of Jamaica
Olympic silver medalists for Jamaica
Olympic bronze medalists for Jamaica
Deaths from cancer in California
Commonwealth Games medallists in athletics
Medalists at the 1972 Summer Olympics
Medalists at the 1968 Summer Olympics
Pan American Games gold medalists for Jamaica
Olympic silver medalists in athletics (track and field)
Olympic bronze medalists in athletics (track and field)
Commonwealth Games gold medallists for Jamaica
Commonwealth Games silver medallists for Jamaica
University of Southern California alumni
Pan American Games medalists in athletics (track and field)
Medalists at the 1971 Pan American Games
Medallists at the 1970 British Commonwealth Games